The blue-eyed pleco (Panaque cochliodon) is a herbivorous freshwater armored catfish endemic to Colombia where it occurs in the Cauca and Magdalena River basins. It is distinguished from many loricariids by being dark grey to black and having bright, turquoise-coloured eyes. Like other species of the genus Panaque, P. cochliodon feeds primarily on submerged wood. Blue-eyed plecos grow to about 30 cm (11.8 inches) in length and, like other Panaque species, they are clumsy swimmers adapted to staying close the substrate, using their sucker-like mouths to hold on to submerged rocks and wood.

Blue-eye plecs as aquarium fish
Blue-eyed plecs have been kept as aquarium fish, and were fairly popular during the 1980s and early 1990s. However, they are now very rarely traded because wild fish can only be obtained from rivers in Colombia considered to be outside the control of the Colombian government.

References

Ancistrini
Fish of South America
Freshwater fish of Colombia
Endemic fauna of Colombia
Magdalena River
Fishkeeping
Taxa named by Franz Steindachner
Fish described in 1879